The DAR 10 (ДАР 10) was a Bulgarian light bomber and reconnaissance aircraft. DAR-10 was designed for horizontal and dive bombing, reconnaissance, and ground attack.

Design and development
The DAR 10 was designed by Zvetan Lazarov in 1938 in the DAR (Darzhavna Aeroplanna Rabotilnitsa, meaning literally 'State Airplane Workshop') factory in Bozhurishte, near the capital Sofia.

The DAR 10 was a single-engine two-seat (pilot and gunner) low-wing cantilever monoplane aircraft of conventional layout.  Its two seats were in tandem under enclosed glazing.  Its tailwheel undercarriage was fixed, and the mainwheels were spatted.  The wings had a wooden structure, covered with plywood.  Flaps were not used.

The fuselage was comparatively wide and deep, to accommodate the nose-mounted radial engine.  It was constructed of steel-tube framework and wood formers, covered with fabric.

Three-bladed steel propellers were used.

Two prototypes were built, powered by different engines:
DAR 10A Bekas (Bulgarian: "snipe"), powered by an Alfa Romeo 128 R.C.21 nine-cylinder radial engine rated at 950 hp (709 kW).  This was the first DAR 10 to fly, on 2 July 1941. It was designed to carry four machine guns (two fixed forward-firing and two in rear gunner position).  It could carry five 100-kg bombs, mounted under the wings.  There was also the possibility of a fixed 20 mm forward-firing cannon installation in the forward fuselage.

This aircraft crashed in October 1942. In spite of good flight reviews, the type was not chosen for production.  The high-wing KB-11 Fazan was selected for production instead.

DAR 10F (the "F" to indicate its Fiat engine), powered by a Fiat A 74 R.C.38 14-cylinder radial engine rated at 870 hp (649 kW).  This aircraft first flew in March 1945. It was slightly heavier and longer than the DAR-10A.  Its top speed was 454 km/h (282 mph). Thanks to a stronger construction and dive brakes, it could serve also as a dive bomber. It could be equipped with two fixed fuselage-mounted 20 mm cannon firing forward, two fixed wing-mounted machine guns, and two machine guns for the gunner. It could carry one 500 kg (1,100 lb) bomb or one 250 kg (551 lb) and four 100 kg (110 lb). The bombs were mounted under the fuselage and wings.

The DAR-10 was not selected for production.  Some sources suggest that it was passed over in favor of the German Junkers Ju 87 Stuka dive bomber, while the improved DAR-10F was not selected as World War II had ended and Bulgaria had access to ample supplies of modern Soviet aircraft such as the Ilyushin Il-2 and Il-10.

Variants
DAR-10A
First prototype, powered by an Alfa Romeo radial engine.
DAR-10F
Second prototype, powered by a Fiat radial engine.

Operators

Bulgarian Air Force

Specifications (DAR-10)

See also

References

Bibliography

External links

Photo of DAR-10A

Single-engined tractor aircraft
Low-wing aircraft
1940s Bulgarian bomber aircraft
1940s Bulgarian military reconnaissance aircraft
DAR 10
World War II Bulgarian light bombers
World War II Bulgarian reconnaissance aircraft
Aircraft first flown in 1941